The 2019 Brasil Open was a tennis tournament played on indoor clay courts. It was the 19th edition of the Brasil Open, and part of the ATP Tour 250 series of the 2019 ATP Tour. It took place from February 25 through March 3, 2019, in São Paulo, Brazil.

Singles main-draw entrants

Seeds 

1 Rankings as of February 18, 2019.

Other entrants 
The following players received wildcards into the singles main draw:
  Pablo Cuevas 
  Thiago Monteiro 
  Thiago Seyboth Wild

The following players received entry from the qualifying draw:
  Facundo Bagnis
  Alessandro Giannessi
  Pedro Martínez
  Pedro Sakamoto

Doubles main-draw entrants

Seeds 

 1 Rankings as of February 18, 2019.

Other entrants 
The following pairs received wildcards into the doubles main draw:
  Thomaz Bellucci /  Rogério Dutra Silva
  Igor Marcondes /  Rafael Matos

Champions

Singles 

  Guido Pella def.  Cristian Garín, 7–5, 6–3.

Doubles 

  Federico Delbonis /  Máximo González def.  Luke Bambridge /  Jonny O'Mara, 6–4, 6–3

References

External links 

 
Brasil Open
2019 in Brazilian tennis
Brasil Open
Brasil Open